Chehra is a 2013 Hindi Horror film directed by Amit-Ashish & Deepak K Bajaj and produced by Veena Bajaj & Deepak K Bajaj. The film features Sheetal Pathak, Saheem Khan and Quaiser Jamal as main characters.

Cast

Sheetal Pathak
Saheem Khan
Quaiser Jamal
Raza Murad
Sandesh Jadhav
Priyanka Gairola
Kumar Sunil
Gautam Berde
Satyapal Landge
Sunil Hirekhan
Rishika Bajaj

Soundtrack

References

2010s Hindi-language films
Indian horror thriller films
2013 films
2013 horror thriller films
2013 horror films